Ortasu is a village in the Uludere District of Şırnak Province in Turkey. The village is populated by Kurds of the Goyan and Sindî tribes and had a population of 713 in 2021.

The hamlets of Alancık and Tarlabaşı are attached to Ortasu.

See also 

 Roboski massacre

References 

Villages in Uludere District
Kurdish settlements in Şırnak Province